Sólo Pienso En Ti (I only think about you) is the eighth album from Mexican pop music singer and actress Lucero. It was released in 1991, selling til today more than 5 million copies. The first single, "Electricidad", went to No. 1 in Mexico in just three weeks. The song was so hot that the second single "Ya No" was No. 2 when the former were still at the top of the charts. Eventually "Ya No" hit the No. 1 spot for 5 weeks, until Luis Miguel's "Inolvidable" debuted at the No. 1. The album was the first of many collaborations with Rafael Pérez Botija.

Track listing
All songs written and arranged by Rafael Pérez Botija.

Singles

Chart performance
This was the first time ever that an album of Lucero entered to the list of Billboard in the category of pop music. The album stayed in the chart of the Latin Pop Albums for 17 weeks, 2 of them were in the top ten; entering at No. 9 and then peaking No. 7. the sales of this disc are estimated between 4 and 5 million copies sold

References

1991 albums
Lucero (entertainer) albums